James Weber Linn (May 11, 1876 in Winnebago, Illinois – July 16, 1939) was an American educator, writer, and politician.

He graduated from University of Chicago in 1897. Linn then taught English at the University of Chicago. He wrote several books. Linn also wrote newspaper and magazine articles. He was the nephew of social worker Jane Addams. Linn served in the Illinois House of Representatives in 1939 when he died while still in office. Linn was a Democrat. Linn died at his summer home, from leukemia,  in Harbert, Michigan.

Notes

1876 births
1939 deaths
People from Winnebago County, Illinois
Politicians from Chicago
Writers from Chicago
University of Chicago alumni
University of Chicago faculty
Democratic Party members of the Illinois House of Representatives
Deaths from cancer in Michigan
Deaths from leukemia